Joannes Chrysostomus Teniers, the religious name of Joannes Jacobus Teniers, also known as Jan Jacob or Jean-Jacques Teniers (1653–1709) was a Flemish preacher and poet. He was the abbot of the St. Michael's  Abbey in Antwerp and in that capacity also the Lord of Berendrecht and Santvliet.

Life
Joannes Chrysostomus Teniers was born in Antwerp, the son of Melchior Teniers and Maria de Backer. He was baptised there on 28 January 1653 with the birth name Joannes Jacobus Teniers.

After studying the Liberal Arts at Leuven University Teniers entered St Michael's Abbey, Antwerp, a house of the Premonstratensian Order. He was professed on 17 January 1675, ordained 13 March 1677, and elected abbot 19 May 1687. As abbot he took the motto Tene Quod Bene ("Hold on to what is good", 1 Thessalonians 5, verse 21).

Teniers died in Antwerp on 30 November 1709. His portrait painted by Jan Erasmus Quellinus is in the collection of Tongerlo Abbey.

Writings
Teniers had some reputation as a preacher and a manuscript of his sermons for feastdays was preserved in the monastery library, as well as two volumes of his notes on the works of St Augustine.

One of Teniers' poems was published in the preliminary matter of Jacobus Moons's Sedelyck Vreughde-Perck (Antwerp, Michiel Knobbaert, 1685).

References

External link

1653 births
Clergy from Antwerp
Old University of Leuven alumni
Members of the States of Brabant
Premonstratensians
Flemish abbots
1709 deaths